Base Aérea de São Paulo – BASP  is a base of the Brazilian Air Force, located in Guarulhos, Brazil.

It shares some facilities with Gov. André Franco Montoro International Airport.

History
São Paulo Air Force Base was created on 22 May 1941 by Decree 3,302 at Campo de Marte Airport. On 26 January 1945 the base was transferred to its present location, then called Cumbica Farm.

Units
Since January 2017 there are no permanent flying units assigned to São Paulo Air Force Base. Whenever needed, the aerodrome is used as a support facility to other air units of the Brazilian Air Force, Navy and Army.

Former Units
May 1969–January 2018: 4th Squadron of Air Transportation (4°ETA) Carajá. The squadron was deactivated on 10 January 2018 and aircraft and personnel transferred to the 3rd Squadron of Air Transportation  (3°ETA) based at Santa Cruz Air Force Base.

Access
The base is located 25 km from downtown São Paulo.

Gallery
This gallery displays aircraft that have been based at São Paulo. The gallery is not comprehensive.

See also
List of Brazilian military bases
Gov. André Franco Montoro International Airport

References

External links

São Paulo (state)
Brazilian Air Force
Brazilian Air Force bases
Buildings and structures in São Paulo
Guarulhos
São Paulo